Tony Kozina (born October 23, 1970) is an American professional wrestler who is best known for his work in the Pacific Northwest especially in Extreme Canadian Championship Wrestling and National Wrestling Alliance. He has also made appearances in Ring of Honor, Pro Wrestling Guerrilla, Full Impact Pro, IWA-Mid South, World Wrestling Entertainment and Total Nonstop Action Wrestling.

Professional wrestling career

Training
In the summer of 1996, Kozina started training with Billy Jack Haynes and "Maniac" Matt Borne and helped train others at North American Wrestling Asylum.

Independent wrestling (1997–present)

On October 20, 1998, Kozina defeated Torch for the newly created NWA Pacific Northwest Junior Heavyweight Championship. On July 21, 2001, Kozina defeated Scotty Mac to claim his sixth NWA Pacific Northwest Junior Heavyweight Championship. The title was vacated on April 5, 2002 due to inactivity. On January 14, 2000, Kozina won his first NWA World Junior Heavyweight Championship by defeating Vince Kaplack. In a rematch at the NWA 52nd Anniversary Show on October 20, Kaplack defeated Kozina to become the NWA World Junior Heavyweight Champion.

Canadian Wrestling's Elite (2015–present)
On May 5, 2017; at Canadian Wrestling's Elite 8th Anniversary Show in Winnipeg, Manitoba; Kozina defeated Mentallo to become the new Canadian Unified Junior Heavyweight Champion.  This marks the first time in nearly 10 years that the title has been active. Following the match, Kozina called out Billy Corgan and the National Wrestling Alliance.  He stated he wants a shot at the NWA World Junior Heavyweight Championship.

On the January 1, 2018, Canadian Wrestling's Elite stopped in St. Albert, Alberta with the "Pick Your Poison Tour." "The Original" Marky defeated Kozina to become the new Canadian Unified Junior Heavyweight Championship. On January 3, 2018; the CWE "Pick Your Poison Tour" made a stop in Calgary, Alberta. Kozina won the Canadian Unified Junior Heavyweight Championship for the second time in a Six Man Scramble which included "The Original" Marky, Chayse Britton, Strife, Darren Burns, and "The Prodigy" Matt Hart.

WWE
On August 10, 2003, Kozina teamed up with Buddy Wayne on an episode of WWE Heat. They lost to the team of Mark Jindrak and Garrison Cade.

Ring of Honor
In January 2011, Kozina faced Davey Richards in Ring of Honor in Philadelphia, Pennsylvania. Richards won via knockout when the referee stopped the bout in just under 5 minutes.

Total Nonstop Action Wrestling
On February 16, 2015 (which aired on September 4, 2015) Kozina faced Davey Richards in Total Nonstop Action Wrestling for the TNA One Night Only Gut Check pay-per-view. Richards won when Kozina went up top for a moonsault, but slipped off and Richards got the roll up for the win.

Fale Dojo (2018–present)
On May 28, 2018 Bad Luck Fale owner of Fale Dojo in New Zealand announced Kozina as their head trainer.

Filmography

Championships and accomplishments
American Wrestling Association Superstars of Wrestling
AWA Washington Light Heavyweight Championship (1 time)
Canadian Wrestling's Elite
Canadian Unified Junior Heavyweight Championship (3 times)
Extreme Canadian Championship Wrestling
NWA Canadian Junior Heavyweight Championship (3 times)
NWA Pacific Northwest Junior Heavyweight Championship (6 times)
National Wrestling Alliance
NWA World Junior Heavyweight Championship (2 times)
National Wrestling Alliance Virginia
NWA Virginia Junior Heavyweight Championship (1 time)
Pinnacle Pro Wrestling
Pinnacle Tag Team Championship (1 time) – with Davey Richards
Pro Wrestling Illustrated
PWI ranked him #179 of the 500 best singles wrestlers of the year in the PWI 500 in 2002
Slam! Wrestling
Canadian Hall of Fame

References

External links
 
Tony Kozina's Online World of Wrestling profile
Slam! Wrestling Canadian Hall of Fame bio

1970 births
Living people
American male professional wrestlers
Sportspeople from Portland, Oregon
Professional wrestlers from Oregon
20th-century professional wrestlers
21st-century professional wrestlers
NWA World Junior Heavyweight Champions